Abhimanyu Singh (born 20 September 1974) is an Indian actor who works mainly in Hindi, Telugu, Tamil and Bhojpuri films.

Career
Singh made his debut with Aks (2001), directed by Rakeysh Omprakash Mehra. He got his first break with the role of Rananjay Singh in Gulaal (2009), directed by Anurag Kashyap. The role won him the 2010 Stardust Award for his breakthrough performance.

He won praises for his role of Bukka Reddy in Rakta Charitra (2010), directed by Ram Gopal Varma. In his review in The Times of India, Nikhat Kazmi compared his performance to that of Heath Ledger in The Dark Knight (2008), which outshone the lead star.

He also received positive reviews for Onir's I Am with Rajeev Masand praising his "brazen, unflinching performance" as a corrupt police officer.

Singh worked with Anil Sharma of Gadar fame's film Genius where he plays a CBI officer. Singh was also seen as the main antagonist opposite Sridevi in Boney Kapoor's Mom, released on 7 July 2017. Singh acted in another Telugu film  directed by B. Gopal's Aradugula Bullettu starring Gopichand and Nayantara, released on 9 June 2017. Apart from this, Singh was also seen in the Tamil film Theeran Adhigaaram Ondru as the main villain opposite Karthi and Rakul Preet Singh which was shot at Rajasthan and Chennai.

Filmography

Film

 2001 — Aks
 2004 — Lakshya
 2007 — Konte Kurrallu
 2007 — Dhol
 2007 — It's Breaking News
 2008 — Jannat
 2009 — Gulaal
 2010 — Rakta Charitra (Hindi, Telugu)
 2010 — Accident on Hill Road
 2010 — The Film Emotional Atyachar 
 2011 — I Am
 2011 — Nenu Naa Rakshasi (Telugu)
 2011 — Velayudham (Tamil)
 2011 — Bodyguard (Telugu)
 2011 — Bejawada (Telugu)
 2012 — Aalaap (Hindi)
 2012 — Gabbar Singh (Telugu)
 2012 — Department (Hindi)
 2013 — Thalaivaa (Tamil)
 2013 — Dalam / Koottam (Telugu, Tamil)
 2013 — Once Upon Ay Time In Mumbai Dobaara! (Hindi)
 2013 — Goliyon Ki Raasleela Ram-Leela (Hindi)
 2014 — Mukunda (Telugu)
 2015 — Pandaga Chesko (Telugu)
 2015 — Mosagallaku Mosagadu (Telugu)
 2015 — 10 Enradhukulla (Tamil)
2015 — Premji: Rise of a Warrior (Gujarati)
 2016 — Attack  (Telugu)
 2015 — Jazbaa
 2015 — Shivam (Telugu)
 2016 — Global Baba (Hindi)
 2016 — Chuttalabbai (Telugu)
 2016 — Eedo Rakam Aado Rakam (Telugu) 
 2016 — Chakravyuha (Kannada)
 2017 — Mom
 2017 — Jai Lava Kusa (Telugu)
 2017 — Theeran Adhigaaram Ondru (Tamil)
 2017 — Oxygen (Telugu)
 2018 — Amar Akbar Anthony (Telugu)
 2018 — My Client's Wife (Hindi)
 2019 — Sita (Telugu)
 2020 — G  (Gujarati)
 2020 — Taish (Hindi)
 2021 — State of Siege: Temple Attack (Hindi)
 2021 — The Battle of Bhima Koregaon (Hindi)
 2021 — Bhavai (Hindi)
 2021 — Annaatthe (Tamil)
 2021 — Sooryavanshi (Hindi)
 2022 — Bachchhan Paandey (Hindi)
 2022 — Nikamma (Hindi)
 2023 —  Selfiee (Hindi)

Television

Web series
 Chacha Vidhayak Hain Humare (Season 1 - 2018) (Season 2 - 2021)
 Bhaukaal (2020)
 Khakee- The Bihar Chapter (2022)

References

Indian male film actors
Living people
Male actors in Hindi cinema
Indian television producers
Male actors from Patna
Indian male television actors
1974 births